A message in a bottle is a form of communication whereby a message is sealed in a container and released into a body of water.

Message in a bottle may also refer to:

 Message in a Bottle (film), a 1999 film based on the 1998 Nicholas Sparks novel
 Message in a Bottle (novel), a 1998 novel by Nicholas Sparks
 "Message in a Bottle" (The Police song), 1979
 "Message in a Bottle" (Taylor Swift song), 2021
 "Message in a Bottle" (Stargate SG-1), a 1998 episode of Stargate SG-1
 "Message in a Bottle" (Star Trek: Voyager), a 1998 episode of Star Trek: Voyager
 The Message in the Bottle, a 1975 collection of essays by novelist Walker Percy
 Message in a Bottle (album), an album by JJ Lin

See also
 "MS. Found in a Bottle," an 1833 short story by Edgar Allan Poe ("MS." = manuscript)
 The Letter in the Bottle, a 2006 non-fiction book by British author Karen Liebreich